Acheilognathus majusculus is a species of freshwater ray-finned fish in the genus Acheilognathus.  It is endemic to the Seomjin and Nakdong rivers in South Korea.  It grows to a maximum length of 10.0 cm.

References

Acheilognathus
Taxa named by Ik-Soo Kim
Fish described in 1998
Fish of East Asia